Buninskaya Alleya is the southern terminus of the Butovskaya Line of the Moscow Metro, and the southernmost station of the entire system. It was opened on 27 December 2003. Like most other stations of the line, it is located above the ground.

The station bears the name of a nearby street which is named after 20th century Russian writer Ivan Bunin. There is a possibility to extend the line further south behind the Buninskaya Alleya station, but this is not included into the extension programme until 2020.

A transfer to the Sokolnicheskaya line is planned after 2023.

Moscow Metro stations
Railway stations in Russia opened in 2003
Butovskaya Line